Sheikh Ali Akbar Masoudi Khomeini , (born 1931) is an Iranian ayatollah. He is a member of the Society of Seminary Teachers of Qom, as well as serving as the Trustee for Fatima Masumeh Shrine.

Early life and education 
Ali Akbar Masoudi was born in 1931 in Khomeyn. He was born into a middle-class family, his father, Gholam Ali Masoudi was a pastry chef. He began his education by attending the same primary school as Ruhollah Khomeini in Khomeyn. When he was 15 he left to Arak to pursue his Islamic studies. There he was taught by several scholars such as Mollah Abdollah and others. He stayed in the seminary in Arak for 2–3 years before leaving to Qom to further his Islamic studies in the Qom Seminary. There he was taught by esteemed Shia scholars such as Mohammad-Reza Golpaygani, Hossein Borujerdi and others. He also spent 4 years in Najaf, attending the Hawza Najaf.

Teachers 
During his time studying Islam, Ali Akbar had several esteemed teachers. Here are some of them.

 Mohammad-Taqi Bahjat Foumani
 Ruhollah Khomeini
 Hossein Borujerdi
 Mohammad-Reza Golpaygani
 Mollah Abdullah
 Sheikh Ahmad al-Tahir
 Musa al-Sadr
 Seyed Reza al-Sadr
 Seyed Ali Arakiyeh

Views and responsibilities 
After the 1979 Iranian revolution, Ali Akbar was elected by Ali Khamenei to replace Ahmad Molaei in 1992, as the Trustee of Fatima Masumeh Shrine. Seyyed Mohammad Saeedi was chosen to replace him in 2010.

He has spoken against Mohammad Yazdi after he sent a letter criticising Mousa Shubairi Zanjani. He believes that Mohammad Yazdi had no right to attack the scholar, when he is "not even close" to his level, and found his letter insulting. He has also criticised Kazem Seddiqi after giving a sermon (Khutbah) regarding the death of Mohammad-Taqi Mesbah-Yazdi.

He advised Mahmoud Ahmadinejad to "stay home and seek the way of God in the remaining years of his life". He criticised Mahmoud's second term of presidency and claimed "In the second term of his presidency, he took several actions that made some people resent and even hate him".

He claims that in the later years of Ahmad Azari Qomi's life, he wrote a letter of apology to Ali Khamenei after their falling out. He went on to say "those who reject such a letter, reject my existence". He presented the letter to Ali Khamenei.

He has also criticised the words of some members in the Guardian Council, as well as some of its functions with seminaries in Qom. He believes seminaries in Qom should abstain from politics.

See also 
 List of Ayatollahs
 Zaynolabideen Ghorbani
 Seyyed Mohammad Ziaabadi

References 

1931 births
Living people
People from Markazi Province
Society of Seminary Teachers of Qom members
Iranian ayatollahs